Bøkfjord Lighthouse is a coastal lighthouse located at the mouth of Bøkfjorden in Troms og Finnmark county, Norway.

History
The lighthouse was established in 1910, and re-built in 1947–1948, having been destroyed during World War II. The lighthouse was listed as a protected site in 1998 and it was automated in 2006.

The light emits two white flashes every 15 seconds. The site is only accessible by boat, and is closed to the public.

See also

Lighthouses in Norway
List of lighthouses in Norway

References

External links
Norsk Fyrhistorisk Forening 

Lighthouses completed in 1910
Lighthouses completed in 1948
Lighthouses in Troms og Finnmark
Sør-Varanger
Listed lighthouses in Norway